Imrekov (masculine) or Imrekova (feminine) is a Russian surname. Notable footballers with the surname include:

Oleg Imrekov (1962–2014)
Arkadi Imrekov (born 1985), his son
Viktor Imrekov (born 1985), his son

Russian-language surnames